Othana (or Othaña) may refer to the following places and jurisdictions :

 Ottana, an Italian town, former bishopric and titular see on Sardina
 Utt'aña